Pentridge is the name of a village in Dorset, England.  

It may  also refer to:
 HM Prison Pentridge, in Victoria, Australia
 Coburg, Victoria, originally named Pentridge

See also
Pentrich, Derbyshire, which was the site of the 1817 Pentrich rising